Canes Venatici II or CVn II is a dwarf spheroidal galaxy situated in the Canes Venatici constellation and discovered in 2006 in data obtained by the Sloan Digital Sky Survey. The galaxy is located at a distance of about 150 kpc from the Sun and moves towards the Sun with the velocity of about 130 km/s.

CVn II is one of the smallest and faintest satellites of the Milky Way—its integrated luminosity is about 8,000 times that of the Sun (absolute visible magnitude of about −4.9), which is much lower than the luminosity of a typical globular cluster. However, its mass is about 2.5 million solar masses, which means that its mass to light ratio is around 340. A high mass to light ratio implies that CVn II is dominated by dark matter.

The stellar population of CVn II consists mainly of old stars formed more than 12 billion years ago. The stars of CVn II  were probably among the first stars to form in the Universe. Currently there is no star formation in CVn II. Measurements have so far failed to detect neutral hydrogen in it—the upper limit is  solar masses.

Notes

References

Dwarf spheroidal galaxies
Canes Venatici
Local Group
Milky Way Subgroup
4713558
?